The Mansion is a four-bedroom mansion owned by music producer Rick Rubin in the Laurel Canyon area of Los Angeles. Originally built in 1918, the house is famous for the successful bands who have recorded music there. The house was owned by Errol Flynn in the late 1930s. Although many say that Harry Houdini lived at the mansion, no one has ever lived in the Mansion under the name "Houdini". There is confusion between The Mansion, at 2451 Laurel Canyon Blvd. and The Houdini Estate, at 2400 Laurel Canyon Blvd.

After recording the Red Hot Chili Peppers' Blood Sugar Sex Magik with considerable ease and comfort, Rubin decided to use the mansion to record many of the albums he has produced, including the Red Hot Chili Peppers' Stadium Arcadium, Audioslave's Out of Exile, The Mars Volta's De-Loused in the Comatorium, Slipknot's Vol. 3: (The Subliminal Verses), and Linkin Park's Minutes to Midnight.

Since 1991, the Red Hot Chili Peppers have returned to the mansion on numerous occasions; the tracks "Fortune Faded" and "Save the Population" on 2003's Greatest Hits compilation, and more recently the group's 2006 album Stadium Arcadium were recorded there. The mansion can also be seen on the Chili Peppers' 1991 DVD Funky Monks, Linkin Park's DVD The Making of Minutes to Midnight, and in a series of eight clips uploaded to LCD Soundsystem's official YouTube channel documenting the creation of This Is Happening.

Houdini connection
In 1919, Houdini rented the cottage at 2435 Laurel Canyon Boulevard in Los Angeles, while making movies for Lasky Pictures.  His wife occupied it for a time after his death. It is said that Houdini did practice his tricks in the pool at 2400 Laurel Canyon Boulevard.

As of 2011 the site of the cottage was a vacant lot and up for sale.  The main mansion building itself was rebuilt after it was destroyed in the 1959 Laurel Canyon fire, and is now a historic venue called The Mansion.  While Houdini did not likely live at the "mansion," there is some probability that his widow did.

This "house" should not be confused with the "House of Houdini" which was a former Houdini home, purchased in 1908, at 278 West 113th Street, Harlem, now called Morningside Heights, New York City that also displays artifacts.

Haunting rumors
The nine-piece metal band Slipknot reported experiencing a number of unusual events while living there during the recording of their album Vol. 3: (The Subliminal Verses). Drummer Joey Jordison claimed to have had an unsettling experience where every night around 4:00 A.M. his bedroom door would open by itself. Also, singer Corey Taylor took pictures of two orbs hovering near the thermostat in his room that changed the temperature.
System of a Down guitarist, Daron Malakian, said that every day around four o'clock, his amp tubes would act strange.

Though it is rumored that the house has been haunted since 1918, when the son of a furniture store owner pushed his lover from the balcony, the present mansion is actually built on the grounds of the old mansion, which burned down in the late 1950s and wasn't rebuilt until years later to be used as a recording arts studio. Nevertheless, during the recording of the Red Hot Chili Peppers' Blood Sugar Sex Magik, more unusual things occurred. Consequently, Red Hot Chili Peppers drummer Chad Smith chose to not live in the house during the recording, while guitarist John Frusciante considered the ghosts friendly. The BSSM album art also features a photograph of a strange orb captured during a group photograph, which the band suggests might have been a spirit at the mansion.

Recordings at the Mansion

Notes

References

Houses in Los Angeles
Recording studios in California
Hollywood Hills
Laurel Canyon, Los Angeles
Reportedly haunted locations in Los Angeles
Rick Rubin